is a passenger railway station located in the city of Hachiōji, Tokyo, Japan, operated by the private railway operator Keio Corporation.

Lines 

Station layout 
This station consists of two opposed side platforms serving two tracks. The platforms and tracks are in a cutting, and the station building is located on the embankment above.

Platforms

History
The station opened on October 1, 1967.

Passenger statistics
In fiscal 2019, the station was used by an average of 16,780 passengers daily. 

The passenger figures (boarding passengers only) for previous years are as shown below.

Surrounding area
 Hachioji West Post Office
 Hachioji City Kunugida Archaeological Park

See also
 List of railway stations in Japan

References

External links

Keio Railway Station Information 

Keio Takao Line
Stations of Keio Corporation
Railway stations in Tokyo
Railway stations in Japan opened in 1967
Hachiōji, Tokyo